The Great Marsh (also sometimes called the Great Salt Marsh) is a long, continuous saltmarsh in eastern New England extending from Cape Ann in northeastern Massachusetts to the southeastern coast of New Hampshire. It includes roughly 20,000–30,000 acres of saltwater marsh, mudflats, islands, sandy beaches, dunes, rivers, and other water bodies. The Great Marsh comprises much of the northeastern half of Essex County, Massachusetts, and touches the towns and cities of Essex, Gloucester, Newburyport, Newbury, Rowley, Ipswich, and Salisbury in Massachusetts as well as the towns of Seabrook and Hampton in New Hampshire. It is a designated Important Bird Area.

References 

Salt marshes
Newbury, Massachusetts
Rowley, Massachusetts
Ipswich, Massachusetts
Wetlands of Massachusetts